Abdelhakim Bezzaz (born October 20, 1992) is an Algerian footballer who currently plays for MO Constantine in the Algerian Ligue Professionnelle 2.

Bezzaz was part of the Algeria national under-17 football team that finished as runner-ups at the 2009 African U-17 Championship and also played at the 2009 FIFA U-17 World Cup.

Bezzaz is the nephew of former Algeria international Yacine Bezzaz.

References

External links
 

1992 births
Algeria youth international footballers
Algerian footballers
Algerian Ligue 2 players
AS Khroub players
Living people
People from Médéa
Association football midfielders
21st-century Algerian people